is one of the private junior Colleges located at Sakura, Chiba in Japan. It is one of the 149 junior colleges in Japan set up in 1950 when the junior college system started. It consists of one department now.

Department and Graduate Course

Departments 
 Department of Child care

See also 
 List of junior colleges in Japan
 Keiai University

External links
 Chiba Keiai Junior College

Private universities and colleges in Japan
Japanese junior colleges
Universities and colleges in Chiba Prefecture